Bornstedt may refer to the following places in Germany:

Bornstedt, Börde, a municipality in the Börde district, Saxony-Anhalt
Bornstedt, Mansfeld-Südharz, a municipality in the Mansfeld-Südharz district, Saxony-Anhalt
Bornstedt (Potsdam), a borough of Potsdam, Brandenburg